

Premier League
 Kilikia are promoted.
 Dinamo-2000 change their name to Dinamo-Zenit Yerevan.
 Lernagorts Kapan changed their name to Lernagorts-Ararat Kapan.
 No team was relegated this season, simply because the Football Federation of Armenia decided to increase the number of teams in the premier league from 8 to 9 for the 2005 season.

First League
 Gandzasar FC form Kapan are introduced to the league.
 Spartak-2 Yerevan change their name to Banants-2.
 Zenit Charentsavan and Dinamo-VZ Yerevan are the reserve teams of Dinamo-Zenit Yerevan.
 Reserve teams cannot promote.

External links
 RSSSF: Armenia 2004